Clinical Autonomic Research is a bimonthly peer-reviewed medical journal covering research on the autonomic nervous system and its disorders. It was established in 1991 and is published by Springer Science+Business Media. The editors-in-chief are Horacio Kaufmann (New York University School of Medicine) and Jens Jordan (German Aerospace Center). It is the official journal of the American Autonomic Society and the European Federation of Autonomic Societies.

Abstracting and indexing
The journal is abstracted and indexed in:

According to the Journal Citation Reports, the journal has a 2021 impact factor of 4.435.

References

External links

Neurology journals
Publications established in 1991
Bimonthly journals
English-language journals
Springer Science+Business Media academic journals